Manfred von Richthofen (4 February 1934 – 1 May 2014) was a German hockey player and coach.

Life
Richthofen was born in Berlin, which was then the capitol of the Weimar Republic. He was a descendant of the German nobility from Prussian Silesia and was the nephew of legendary World War I flying ace Manfred von Richthofen ("The Red Baron"). His ice hockey career began during the 1950s. He retired in 2006 and served as an honorary President of German's national Olympic federation.

Reviewing the 2008 biopic The Red Baron, he said "It's a remarkable movie... Somehow it did not turn into a war film. The personality and especially the thoughtfulness of my uncle are true to life."

Richthofen died in Berlin, Germany from unknown causes, aged 80.

References

1934 births
2014 deaths
German male field hockey players
Field hockey players from Berlin
German field hockey coaches
Manfred
Commanders Crosses of the Order of Merit of the Federal Republic of Germany
Recipients of the Order of Merit of Berlin